The 2018–19 season was Accrington Stanley's first-ever season in League One and their 50th year in existence. Along with competing in League One, the club also participated in the FA Cup, EFL Cup and EFL Trophy. The season ran from 1 July 2018 to 30 June 2019.

Transfers

Transfers in

Transfers out

Loans in

Loans out

Competitions

Friendlies
Stanley announced pre-season fixtures against Huddersfield Town, Middlesbrough and Blackburn Rovers.

League One

League table

Result summary

Results by matchday

Matches

August

September

October

November

December

January

February

March

April

May

FA Cup

The first round draw was made live on BBC by Dennis Wise and Dion Dublin on 22 October. The draw for the second round was made live on BBC and BT by Mark Schwarzer and Glenn Murray on 12 November. The third round draw was made live on BBC by Ruud Gullit and Paul Ince from Stamford Bridge on 3 December 2018. The fourth round draw was made live on BBC by Robbie Keane and Carl Ikeme from Wolverhampton on 7 January 2019.

EFL Cup

On 15 June 2018, the draw for the first round was made in Vietnam.

EFL Trophy
On 13 July 2018, the initial group stage draw bar the U21 invited clubs was announced. The draw for the second round was made live on Talksport by Leon Britton and Steve Claridge on 16 November. On 8 December, the third round draw was drawn by Alan McInally and Matt Le Tissier on Soccer Saturday.

Statistics

Appearances and goals

|-
! colspan=14 style=background:#dcdcdc; text-align:center| Goalkeepers

|-
! colspan=14 style=background:#dcdcdc; text-align:center| Defenders

|-
! colspan=14 style=background:#dcdcdc; text-align:center| Midfielders

|-
! colspan=14 style=background:#dcdcdc; text-align:center| Forwards

|-
! colspan=14 style=background:#dcdcdc; text-align:center| Players transferred out during the season

|}

Disciplinary record

References

Accrington Stanley
Accrington Stanley F.C. seasons